China Energine International (Holdings) Limited, or China Energine, is a Hong Kong-based and Cayman Islands-incorporated holding company. The controlling shareholder was Chinese state-owned mega-conglomerate China Aerospace Science and Technology Corporation (CASC). The company was formerly known as CASIL Telecommunications Holdings Limited; CASIL was an acronym of China Aerospace International Holdings Limited, a listed subsidiary of CASC.

Both China Energine and CASIL were red chip companies. China Energine became a listed company on 11 August 1997. On 30 June 2016, it had a market capitalization of HK$2.752 billion.

China Energine engages in wind power and telecommunication equipment manufacturing business.

History
CASIL Telecommunications Holdings Limited ("CASIL Telecom" or "Castel" in short) was spin-off from China Aerospace International Holdings Limited (CASIL) in 1997. CASIL was a subsidiary of China Aerospace Science and Technology Corporation (CASC). , CASC, via China Academy of Launch Vehicle Technology and its BVI subsidiary, "Astrotech Group Limited", owned 73.10% shares of the listed company. In 2008, the wind power business was injected to the listed company, as well as renaming the company to China Energine International (Holdings) Limited. The brand Castel was retained by the Hong Kong-incorporated subsidiary "China Aerospace Telecommunications Limited".

The company had caused a controversy by not removing Au-yeung Keung as the company secretary (a position in a listed company that was regulated) in 2016, despite his accountancy registration has been suspended for three years in 2016.

Name
The English name, Energine, was a phase that combined energy and engine; the Chinese name, combined the Chinese character for 10,000 and [energy] source.

The slogan of the company was "from engine to new energy".

Shareholders
, China Energine major shareholder was Astrotech Group Limited for 60.64%, which was a subsidiary of China Academy of Launch Vehicle Technology, in turn a wholly owned subsidiary of China Aerospace Science and Technology Corporation, in turn a wholly owned subsidiary of the State-owned Assets Supervision and Administration Commission of the State Council. As the company was incorporated outside mainland China but controlled by the Chinese Government, the company is a red chip company.

See also
 APT Satellite Holdings, sister company in Hong Kong
 China Aerospace International Holdings, sister company in Hong Kong

References

External links
 

Holding companies of Hong Kong
Engineering companies of China
Companies listed on the Hong Kong Stock Exchange
Government-owned companies of China
Offshore companies of the Cayman Islands
Chinese brands